Lithuania is a European Parliament constituency for elections in the European Union covering the member state of Lithuania. It is currently represented by thirteen Members of the European Parliament.

Members of the European Parliament

Current Members of the European Parliament

Elections

2004

The 2004 European election was the sixth election to the European Parliament. As Lithuania had only joined the European Union earlier that month, it was the first election European election held in that state. The election took place on 13 June. 2004.

2009

The 2009 European election was the seventh election to the European Parliament and the second for Lithuania. Lithuania's number of seats was reduced to twelve.

2014

The 2014 European election was the eighth election to the European Parliament and the third for Lithuania.

2019

The 2019 European election was the ninth election to the European Parliament and the fourth for Lithuania.

References

External links
 European Election News by European Election Law Association (Eurela)
 List of MEPs europarl.europa.eu

European Parliament elections in Lithuania
European Parliament constituencies
2004 establishments in Lithuania
Constituencies established in 2004